Ken Hodges (1922–2005) was a British cinematographer of film and television. He began as an assistant cameraman just after the Second World War.

Selected filmography

Cinema

 Behemoth the Sea Monster (1959)
 Desert Mice (1959)
 Danger Tomorrow (1960)
 The Gentle Trap (1960)
 Faces in the Dark (1960)
 Sword of Sherwood Forest (1960)
 A Weekend with Lulu (1961)
 Ticket to Paradise (1961)
 Freedom to Die (1961)
 Night Without Pity (1961)
 Emergency (1962)
 Doomsday at Eleven (1962)
 Two Letter Alibi (1962)
Dead Man's Evidence (1962)
 Gaolbreak (1962)
 Hair of the Dog (1962)
 It's All Happening (1963)
 The Comedy Man (1964)
 The Great St. Trinian's Train Robbery (1966)
 The Jokers (1967)
 The Shuttered Room (1967)
 Assignment K (1968)
 Inadmissible Evidence (1968)
 Last of the Long-haired Boys (1968)
 Negatives (1968)
 The File of the Golden Goose (1969)
 Every Home Should Have One (1970)
 Assault (1971)
 Revenge (1971)
 The Ruling Class (1972)
 Never Mind the Quality Feel the Width (1973)
 Penny Gold (1973)
 No Sex Please, We're British (1973)
 Feelings (1974)
 The Spiral Staircase (1975)
 Confessions of a Driving Instructor (1976)
 Stand Up, Virgin Soldiers (1977)
 Confessions from a Holiday Camp (1977)
 The Odd Job (1978)

Television
 The Buccaneers (1956)
 The Adventures of Sir Lancelot (1956)
 The Adventures of Robin Hood (1956-1960)
 Sword of Freedom (1957-1959)
 The Four Just Men (1959–60)
 Espionage (1963-1964)
 The Third Man (1964)
 Danger Man (1964)
 Court Martial (1965–66)
 Star Maidens (1976)

References

Bibliography 
 Howard Maxford. Hammer Complete: The Films, the Personnel, the Company. McFarland, 2018.

External links 
 

1922 births
2005 deaths
British cinematographers
People from Blackheath, London